Eduardo García Máynez (January 11, 1908 – September 2, 1993) was an academic, jurist and philosopher of Mexican law. He was a member of the National College, managing Director of Instituto Tecnologico Autonomo de Mexico, teacher at National Autonomous University of Mexico, General Secretary and researcher at Instituto de Investigaciones Filosoficas and writer of books on law.

National Autonomous University of Mexico alumni
Academic staff of the National Autonomous University of Mexico
1908 births
1993 deaths
20th-century Mexican lawyers
20th-century Mexican philosophers